Substitution Mass Confusion: A Tribute to The Cars is a 2005 compilation album featuring covers of songs originally performed by the American rock band The Cars. The album was released by Not Lame Recordings. Many of the performers featured on the album were from the Boston area, where The Cars first gained exposure in the late 1970s.

The line 'Substitution Mass Confusion' comes from a lyric in the Cars song "Bye Bye Love".

According to Billboard, the album was inspired by the 2000 cancer death of Cars singer and bassist Benjamin Orr. A portion of the album's proceeds were to be donated to the American Cancer Society in Orr's memory.

Reception
Boston Globe writer Jim Sullivan noted that while many of the performances were faithful to the original arrangements, some, including Butch Walker's acoustic version of "My Best Friend's Girl", were significant departures. Cars keyboardist Greg Hawkes singled out Damone's version of "Just What I Needed" and Spiraling's version of "Bye Bye Love" for praise.

Track listing

References

2005 compilation albums
The Cars tribute albums